Samuel Hafenreffer (26 April 1587 – 26 September 1660) was a German physician, who in 1660 introduced the definition of pruritus. Pruritus is the "unpleasant sensation" the body produces that provokes a person to scratch themselves.  Hafenreffer is also credited as being the author of the first textbook in German speaking countries on the subject of dermatology.

References

1587 births
1660 deaths
16th-century German physicians
17th-century German physicians
17th-century German writers
17th-century German male writers